Adelaide is the capital city of South Australia.

Adelaide may also refer to:

People
 Adelaide (given name), including a list of people

Places

Australia 
 Adelaide Airport, in South Australia
 Adelaide Airport, South Australia, a suburb
 Adelaide railway station, in South Australia
 Adelaide River, Northern Territory
 Adelaide Street, Brisbane, Queensland
 City of Adelaide, South Australia, a local government area 
 Division of Adelaide, South Australia, an electorate in the federal parliament of Australia
 Electoral district of Adelaide, South Australia, an electorate in the state parliament 
 Port Adelaide, in South Australia

Canada
 Adelaide, a community in the township of Adelaide Metcalfe, Ontario
 Adelaide Peninsula, Nunavut
 Bay Adelaide Centre, an office complex in the Toronto's Financial District, which includes the Adelaide Hotel Toronto

United States
 Adelaide, Fremont County, Colorado, a former mining camp
 Adelaide, Lake County, Colorado
 Adelaide, Georgia
 Adelaide Peak (Washington), a summit in Olympic National Park
 Adelaide Township, Bowman County, North Dakota

Elsewhere
 Adelaide, Eastern Cape, South Africa, a town and area
 Adelaide Island, an island located off the west coast of the Antarctic Peninsula
 Adelaide railway station (Northern Ireland)

Arts, entertainment, and media

Fictional characters
 Adelaide, a character in Philip Pullman's Sally Lockhart series of books
 Adelaide of the Pasture, a character from the animated miniseries Over the Garden Wall
 Adelaide Chang, a character in The Loud House and its spin-off The Casagrandes

Music

Classical music and operas
 "Adelaide" (Beethoven), a song for voice and piano by Ludwig van Beethoven, after Matthisson's poem
 Adelaide (Sartorio), an opera by the 16th century composer Antonio Sartorio
 "Adelaide" (Schubert), a song for voice and piano by Franz Schubert, after Matthisson's poem
 Adelaide, an opera by Giovanni Maria Orlandini 1729
 Adelaide, an opera by the 18th century composer Nicola Porpora
 Adélaïde Concerto, falsely attributed to Wolfgang Amadeus Mozart, actually by Marius Casadesus
 Adélaïde ou le langage des fleurs, a 1912 ballet version of Valses Nobles et Sentimentales (Ravel)

Songs
 "Adelaide", a song by Anberlin from the album Cities
 "Adelaide", a song by John Cale from the album Vintage Violence
 "Adelaide", a song by Thomas Dybdahl from the album ...That Great October Sound
 "Adelaide", a song by Ben Folds
 "Adelaide", a song by Paul Kelly and the Coloured Girls from the album Gossip
 "Adelaide", a song from the film of Guys and Dolls, written and composed by Frank Loesser
 "Adelaide", a song by Meg Myers
 "Adelaide", a song by the Old 97's from the album Drag It Up
 "Adelaide", a hymntune composed by George C. Stebbins for the lyrics of "Have Thine Own Way" by Adelaide A. Pollard

Other uses in arts, entertainment, and media
 Adélaïde (film), a 1968 French film
 "Adelaide", a poem by Friedrich von Matthisson

Ships
 Adelaide (1832), a wooden cutter was wrecked in New South Wales in May 1834
 PS Adelaide, (1866), second oldest wooden hulled paddle steamer still operating anywhere in the world.
 Adelaide (1879), a wooden schooner lost after leaving Newcastle, New South Wales
 Adelaide (ship), a wooden cutter that was in New South Wales in July 1837
 Adelaide (shipwrecked 1850), a British ship from Bristol
 Adelaide, a New Zealand Company sailing ship that bought immigrants to New Zealand from England in 1839–40
 Adelaide class frigate, a class of Australian naval vessel
 HMAS Adelaide, several Australian naval vessels
 HMS Adelaide, name of three ships of the British Royal Navy

Other uses
 Adelaide (horse), an Irish-bred racehorse
 Adelaide Football Club, an Australian rules football club
 Adelaide Mansions, a listed building in Hove, East Sussex, England
 Adelaide Steamship Company, a defunct Australian company

See also
 Adelaide River (disambiguation)
 Adelheid
 City of Adelaide (disambiguation)
North Adelaide (disambiguation)
 Port Adelaide (disambiguation)
 Queen Adelaide (disambiguation)
 Adelaide Street (disambiguation)
 
 

nl:Adelheid